The 2004 Ukrainian Cup Final was a football match that took place at the NSC Olimpiyskiy on 30 May 2004. The match was the 13th Ukrainian Cup Final and it was contested by Shakhtar Donetsk and Dnipro Dnipropetrovsk. The Olympic stadium is the traditional arena for the cup final.

Road to Kyiv 

All 16 Ukrainian Premier League clubs do not have to go through qualification to get into the competition; Dnipro and Shakhtar therefore both qualified for the competition automatically.

Previous Encounters

Match details

Match statistics

See also
 Ukrainian Cup 2003-04
 Ukrainian Premier League 2003-04

References

External links 

Cup Final
Ukrainian Cup finals
Ukrainian Cup Final 2004
Ukrainian Cup Final 2004
Sports competitions in Kyiv